is a song by Japanese singer-songwriter Rina Aiuchi. It was released on 19 December 2007 through Giza Studio, as a double A-side with "Party Time Party Up" and the third single from her sixth studio album Trip. The single was released in the four editions: two standard editions and two limited editions. Following the release, the single peaked at number eight in Japan and has sold over 18,413 copies nationwide. The song served as the theme songs to the Japanese television show, Kami Summers.

Track listing

Charts

Certification and sales

|-
! scope="row"| Japan (RIAJ)
| 
| 18,413
|-
|}

Release history

References

2007 singles
2007 songs
J-pop songs
Song recordings produced by Daiko Nagato
Songs written by Rina Aiuchi